William Lawrence may refer to:

Public officials and noblemen

American
William Lawrence (Ohio Democrat) (1814–1895), Democrat; U.S. congressman, 1857–1859
William Lawrence (Ohio Republican) (1819–1899), Republican; U.S. congressman, 1865–1871 and 1873–1877
William A. Lawrence (Wisconsin politician) (1822–1890), American legislator for the Wisconsin State Assembly and the Wisconsin Senate
William Beach Lawrence (1800–1881), lawyer, diplomat, historian and political figure; Rhode Island's lieutenant governor and acting governor in 1851–1852
William Caldwell Anderson Lawrence (died 1860), lawyer and state legislator in Pennsylvania
William Miner Lawrence (1861–1935), Assemblyman from New York, 1891
William T. Lawrence (politician) (1788–1859), Whig congressman from New York, 1847–1849
William T. Lawrence (judge) (born 1947), former United States federal judge

Australian
William Lawrence (Australian politician) (1906–2004), Liberal member of House of Representatives for Wimmera, 1949–1958

English
William Lawrence, 14th-century Member of Parliament (MP) for Lancashire
William Lawrence I, MP for Winchester
William Lawrence, 16th-century MP for Winchester
William Lawrence (died 1572), MP for Huntingdonshire
Sir William Lawrence, 1st Baronet (1783–1867), physician; prolific author and philosopher; Serjeant Surgeon to the Queen
William Lawrence (London MP) (1818–1897), Liberal Member of Parliament for City of London (1865–1874 and 1880–1885)    
William Lawrence (Conservative politician) (1844–1935), Conservative Member of Parliament for Liverpool Abercromby (1885–1906)
William Lawrence (Ripon MP) (c. 1723–1798), British politician
Sir William Lawrence, 3rd Baronet (1870–1934), horticulturalist, hospital administrator and collector; grandson of Sir William Lawrence, 1st Baronet
Sir William Lawrence, 4th Baronet (1913–1986), businessman; served as major in World War II
Sir William Lawrence, 5th Baronet (1954–2015), served on Stratford-upon-Avon District Council since 1982

Clergymen
William Lawrence (bishop) (1850–1941), American Episcopal bishop of Massachusetts
William Appleton Lawrence (1889–1968), American Episcopal bishop of Western Massachusetts, son of the above

Film and television personalities
W. E. Lawrence (1896–1947), American supporting actor in silent films
Bill Lawrence (news personality) (1916–1972), American journalist for The New York Times and ABC News
Bill Lawrence (TV producer) (born 1968), American television producer, director, writer and program creator
William Matthew Lawrence (born 1981), American television and film actor

Others
William Dawson Lawrence (1817–1886), successful shipbuilder, businessman and politician
William D. Lawrence (ship), an 1874 full-rigged sailing ship
William Effingham Lawrence (1781–1841), English-Australian landowner; in Tasmania since 1823; leader in social and educational endeavours
Robert William Lawrence (1807–1833), his son, English-Australian botanical enthusiast
William Van Duzer Lawrence (1842–1927), American entrepreneur; pharmaceutical and real estate mogul; philanthropist and arts patron
William P. Lawrence (1930–2005), American naval aviator who reached the rank of vice-admiral; superintendent of U.S. Naval Academy
William Witherle Lawrence (1876–1936), American philologist and professor of English
Bill Lawrence (guitar maker) (1931–2013), German-American recording artist and guitar maker
Billy Lawrence (born 1971), American female singer, songwriter, record producer and arranger
Bill Lawrence (baseball) (1906–1997), American baseball player
Bill Lawrence (cricketer) (born 1963), New Zealand cricketer
Trevor Lawrence (William Trevor Lawrence; born 1999), American football quarterback

See also
Bill Laurance (born 1981), English composer, producer, and musician
William L. Laurence (1888–1977), Lithuanian-American science journalist for The New York Times (1930–64)